Get Ready is the second album by the gospel group Virtue, released in 1999. The album contains the singles "Get Ready," "Love Me Like You Do," "Angels Watching Over Me," and "Put Your War Clothes On."

The album is a mixture of adult contemporary, gospel, and soul musical styles.

Critical reception
AllMusic called the album "emotionally and sonically ambitious," writing that "the quartet's amazing harmonies carry urban, gospel and R&B settings equally well."

Track listing
Get Ready - 4:44
Put Your War Clothes On - 4:15
Now's the Time - 4:10
Angels Watching Over Me - 4:34
Fly Away - 4:21
My Heart's With You - 4:11
Love Me Like You Do - 4:17
Super Victorious - 3:48
You Encourage My Soul - 4:31  
Don't Take Your Joy - 4:28
Be Grateful - 4:53

Charts

Weekly charts

Year-end charts

References 

Virtue (musical group) albums
1999 albums